

Analogue vocoder models

Analog-Lab X-32 [32-band] 
Behringer VC340 Analog Vocoder
Bode Model 7702 [16-band] 
Doepfer Modular Vocoder subsystem A-129
Dynacord SRV66 
Elektronika (Электроника) EM 26 
EMS
EMS Vocoder 1000
EMS Vocoder 2000 [16-band] 
EMS Vocoder 3000 [16-band] 
EMS Vocoder 5000 
Farad - Bruce Haack Custom Model
Korg VC-10 [20-band]
Kraftwerk Custom Model (See photo in main article: Vocoder)
Krok (Крок) 2401 Vocoder (Вокодер) [24-band]
MAM Vocoder VF11 
FAT PCP-330 Procoder 
Next! VX-11 Vocoder 
Moog:
R.A. Moog Modular Vocoder [11-band ?]
Moog Modular Vocoder (spectrum encoder-decoder, 10 Band)
Moog 16 channel Vocoder (Bode model 7702) [16-band] 
PAiA 6710 Vocoder 
Roland SVC-350 [11-band ?]
Roland VP-330 Vocoder Plus [10-band] 
Sennheiser VSM 201 [20-band] 
Siemens Synthesizer 
Sky Soundlab (formerly Seekers) Voice Spectra [12-band]
Synton:
Syntovox 202
Syntovox 216 [14-band] 
Syntovox 221
Syntovox 222

Hardware DSP vocoder models

Access Virus C Series/Virus TI Series [32-band]
Akai Professional MiniAK (Virtual Analog Synth) [40-band]
Alesis:
Akira
Alesis Ion [40-band]
Metavox
Alesis Micron [40-band]
Behringer:
2024 DSP Virtualizer Pro
FX2000 Virtualizer 3D
Clavia Nord Modular
DigiTech:
Talker
S100/S200
StudioQuad 4
Electrix WarpFactory
Electro-Harmonix:
Iron Lung
V256 Vocoder
Voice Box (Harmony Machine and Vocoder)
Ensoniq 
DP/4
FIZMO
Eventide Harmonizer
SP2016
H3000
H7600
H8000
Orvillle
Korg:
DVP-1 Digital Voice Processor
microKorg
MS2000 [16-band]
R3 [16-Band]
Radias
Wavestation EX
Wavestation A/D
Wavestation SR (Note: No voice input capability)
Triton
OASYS
M3
Kronos
Kurzweil:
K2500 / K2600 (requires sampling option and KDFX)
Novation:
A-station (Analog Modeling Synthesizer Vocoder)
K-Station KS4 / KS5 / KS Rack [16-band]
Nova / Nova II [40-band]
Supernova / Supernova II [42-band]
Mininova / Morodernova
UltraNova
Quasimidi Sirius
Roland:
Boss SE-50 [7-band]
Boss SE-70 [10-band, 21-band]
Boss VO-1
JP-8080 [12-band]
Juno-Stage [10-band]
Juno Di
Juno DS
JD-Xi
JD-XA
MV-8000 / MV-8800 [10-Band Vocoder]
SP-808 [10-band]
VP-03 [10 Band]
VP-550
VP-70
VP-770
VP-9000
VP-7
VT-3 [Internal carrier only, classic robot]
VT-4 [Internal carrier, 4 variations, external carrier via USB only]
V-Synth
System 8
Fantom 6/7/8 [up to 32 bands]
Soundart Chameleon with the Infiltrator "soundskin"
Symbolic Sound Kyma/Pacarana
TC-Helicon VoiceTone Synth (HardTune & Vocoder Pedal)
Waldorf Q
STVC (String synthesizer with a vocoder)
Yamaha
Yamaha PLG100VH
Yamaha MOTIF XS/XF
Yamaha Montage
Yamaha MOX6/MOX8
Yamaha MOXF
Yamaha Tyros 5
Yamaha PSR-S975/S775
Zoom Studio 1201 / 1204 [11-band, 18-band] (Note: 1202 has no vocoder)

Software vocoder models
Ableton Live Vocoder effect (built-in since version 8.x)
Apple EVP-1 (component of Logic Studio, originally developed by Emagic as an optional add-on to Logic Audio)
Arturia Vocoder
Eiosis ELS Vocoder (software reproduction of EMS Vocoder 5000) 
EVOC-20
Image-Line Fruity Vocoder, Vocodex
Native Instruments Vokator
Reason Studios BV-512 [4 to 512-band]
Prosoniq OrangeVocoder
TAL-Vocoder
Waldorf Lector
Waves Morphoder
TubeOhm Vocoder-II 
 Voice Synth - 3 vocoders with 24 bands, slew rate, stroboscopic gate (iOS and MacOS)
VirSyn Matrix Vocoder
 Superpowered Vocoder

References

Models

Audio effects
Electronic musical instruments
Music hardware